Helmy Toulan (born 30 November 1949) is an Egyptian football coach and former player with Zamalek SC.

Managerial statistics

Honours

As a player
Zamalek SC
Egypt Cup: 1974–75

As a manager
Zamalek SC
Egypt Cup: 2012–13

References

External links
 Playersglobe.net

1949 births
Living people
Egyptian footballers
Association football midfielders
Egyptian Premier League players
Zamalek SC players
Egyptian football managers
Zamalek SC managers
Haras El Hodoud SC managers
Al Masry SC managers
Al-Ahly SC (Benghazi) managers
Petrojet SC managers
Tala'ea El Gaish SC managers
Smouha SC managers
Al Ittihad Alexandria Club managers
ENPPI SC managers
Egyptian expatriate football managers
Expatriate football managers in the United Arab Emirates
Egyptian expatriate sportspeople in the United Arab Emirates
Expatriate football managers in Libya
Egyptian expatriate sportspeople in Libya